This is a discography of Gang Green, an American hardcore punk band from Boston. The band has released four studio albums, 6 extended plays, and one live album.

Studio albums
{|class="wikitable"
! Year
! width="180"| Title
! Label
|-
|align="center"|1986
|Another Wasted Night
|Taang! Records
|-
|align="center"|1987
|You Got It
|Roadrunner Records
|-
|align="center"|1989
|Older... Budweiser
|Roadrunner Records
|-
|align="center"|1997
|Another Case Of Brewtality
|Taang! Records
|-
|}

Live albums
{|class="wikitable"
! Year
! width="180"| Title
! Label
|-
|align="center"|1990
| Can't LIVE Without It
|Roadrunner Records
|-
|}

Compilations
{|class="wikitable"
! Year
! width="180"| Title
! Label
|-
|align="center"|1991
| King Of Bands
|Roadrunner Records
|-
|align="center"|1991
| Another Wasted Night
|Taang! Records
|-
|align="center"|1997
| Preschool
|Taang! Records
|-
|align="center"|2006
| The Taang Years
|Golf Records
|-
|}

EPs
{|class="wikitable"
! Year
! width="180"| Title
! Label
|-
|align="center"|1984
|Sold Out 7"
|Taang! Records
|-
|align="center"|1985
|Drunk And Disorderly 10"
|Deluxe Music
|-
|align="center"|1985
|P.M.R.C. Sucks 12"
|Him Records
|-
|align="center"|1985
|Skate To Hell 7"
|Taang! Records
|-
|align="center"|1988
|I81B4U
|Roadrunner Records
|-
|align="center"|1997
|Back & Gacked
|Taang! Records
|-
|}

Various artists compilation tracks
This Is Boston, Not L.A. (1982) Modern Method
"Snob" – "Lie Lie" – "I Don't Know" – "Rabies" – "Narrow Mind" – "Kill a Commie" – "Have Fun"
Unsafe at Any Speed (1982) Modern Method 
"Selfish"
Thrasher Skaterock Vol. 3 (1985) Thrasher/High Speed
"Skate to Hell"
Mr. Beautiful Presents: All Hard (1985, Modern Method)
"Let's Drink Some Beer"
American Hardcore: The History of American Punk Rock 1980-1986 [Soundtrack] (2006, Rhino)
"Kill a Commie"

Discographies of American artists
Punk rock group discographies